Tequeño is a fried breaded cheese stick or a spear of bread dough with queso blanco (fresh cheese) stuffed in the middle, and is a popular meal or snack in Venezuela. To prepare it, the dough is wrapped around a cheesestick and formed into a breadstick so it can be fried in oil or sometimes oven-baked. Tequeños can be eaten for breakfast, as a side appetizer, or as a snack food at parties and weddings.

The snack is named after Los Teques after being invented in the kitchen of one of the wealthy families living there.

Variations 
Many different recipes for tequeños can be found online. Tequeños can be made with different varieties of cheese, and even with sweet fillings like chocolate or guava although salty white cheeses are the most popular. Tequeños have become very popular in other regions within Latin America because of how easy they are to make, thanks to the Venezuelan diaspora. They have also become increasingly popular in Spain.

There are similar dishes, such as Peruvian Tequeños, which use a Wantán dough and can have other fillings than cheese, but inspired by venezuelan tequeños. They are often eaten with Guacamole.

See also

Lumpiang keso
Mozzarella sticks
Sigara böreği
 List of breads

References 

Breads
Venezuelan cuisine
Snack foods